Christian James (born October 23, 1996) is an American professional basketball player for Bambitious Nara of the Japanese B.League. He played college basketball for the Oklahoma Sooners.

Early life and high school career
James began training with former NBA player John Lucas II in eighth grade. He attended Bellaire High School in Bellaire, Texas. As a junior, he averaged 20 points and eight rebounds per game, earning District MVP honors. James suffered a broken tibia in his left leg during an Amateur Athletic Union game before his senior season. Due to the injury, he was limited to two games as a senior. James committed to play college basketball for Oklahoma over offers from Oregon, Houston, Oklahoma State, LSU and Maryland.

College career
As a freshman at Oklahoma, James helped his team reach the Final Four round of the 2016 NCAA tournament. He posted 2.9 points and 1.7 rebounds per game but began to produce more later in the season. He was expected to replace Buddy Hield as a sophomore but struggled to shoot the ball, averaging 7.9 points per game and shooting 36 percent from the field. As a junior, James became a regular starter and averaged 11.9 points and 4.5 rebounds per game. He was placed in a leading role in his senior season with the departure of Trae Young. In his season opener on November 9, 2018, James scored a career-high 29 points in a 91–76 win over Texas–Rio Grande Valley. As a senior, he averaged 14.6 points and 6.2 rebounds per game, earning Third Team All-Big 12 honors.

Professional career
On July 26, 2019, James signed his first professional contract with Fortitudo Agrigento of the Italian Serie A2 Basket. On March 19, 2020, he was authorized to return to his family in the United States amid the COVID-19 pandemic. In 22 games, James averaged 17.4 points, 4.8 rebounds and 2.2 assists per game. On July 11, he signed with Mantovana of the Serie A2.

References

External links
Oklahoma Sooners bio

1996 births
Living people
American men's basketball players
Shooting guards
Small forwards
Oklahoma Sooners men's basketball players
Basketball players from Houston
Fortitudo Agrigento players
Pallacanestro Mantovana players
Bellaire High School (Bellaire, Texas) alumni
American expatriate basketball people in Italy